Saint Suzanne may refer to a number of saints including:
 Susanna (Book of Daniel)
 Susanna (disciple)
 Saint Susanna, a saint whose feast day is August 11
 Saint Susanna Cobioje, also known as Saint Susanna Kobioje or Susanna Coboio 

Female saints
Suzanne